Walt Disney Presents: Annette is a television serial that ran on The Mickey Mouse Club during the show's third season (1957–1958). It starred Annette Funicello as Annette McCleod, a poor, orphaned country girl who moves into town with her upper-class Uncle Archie and Aunt Lila. The serial also starred Richard Deacon as Archie McCleod, Sylvia Field as Archie's sister Lila McCleod, Mary Wickes as Katie the housekeeper and prolific Disney child stars Tim Considine, David Stollery and Roberta Shore as Annette's friends. The story was adapted by Lillie Hayward (who also worked on Spin and Marty) from the book Margaret by Janette Sebring Lowrey.

Annette was released to DVD in 2008 as part of the Walt Disney Treasures series.

Plot
The story is about a recently orphaned country girl, Annette, who moves in with her sophisticated aunt and uncle who live in the city. Most of the plot has to do with her experiences in her new high school trying to fit in with all the new kids she meets in her new community.

However, Laura, the jealous teen, wrongfully accuses Annette of stealing a necklace following a party at her place. Little did she know that the necklace accidentally fell into the piano she played on. Laura and Annette become friends after the misunderstanding.

Episodes and original airdates (1958)
 "An Introduction"—2/10
 "The Newcomer"—2/11 
 "Annette Meets Jet"—2/12
 "An Invitation"—2/13
 "The Escort"—2/14
 "The Party"—2/17
 "Paying The Piper"—2/18
 "The Missing Necklace"—2/19
 "What Happened At School"—2/20
 "Almost A Fight"—2/21
 "Steady Gets An Idea"—2/24
 "The Explosion"—2/25
 "The Turned Down Invitation"—2/26
 "Annette Makes A Decision"—2/27
 "The Hayride"—2/28
 "The Barbecue"—3/3
 "The Fight"—3/4
 "The Farewell Letter"—3/5
 "Mike To The Rescue"—3/6
 "The Mystery Is Solved"—3/7

Cast
Annette Funicello—Annette McCleod
Tim Considine—Steve Abernathy
David Stollery—Mike Martin
Roberta Shore—Laura Rogan (as Jymme Shore)
Judy Nugent—Jet Maypen
Doreen Tracy—Val Abernathy
Shelley Fabares—Moselle Corey
Steve Stevens—Drew Stafford
Rudy Lee—Olmstead "Steady" Ware
Sharon Baird—Kitty Blalock
Barry Curtis—Court Whitney
Tommy Cole—Jimmy Smith
Cheryl Holdridge—Madge Markham
Bonnie Lynn Fields—Pat Boren
Doris Packer—Mrs. Abernathy
Mary Wickes—Katie
Richard Deacon—Uncle Archie McCleod
Sylvia Field—Aunt Lila McCleod
Ralph Dumke-Mr. Abernathy

Theme song, plus other songs
The theme song "Annette" was written and originally sung by Mickey Mouse Club leader Jimmie Dodd on a 1956 episode of the MMC. A remixed version with special messages from Frankie Avalon, Shelley Fabares, Paul Anka, Tommy Sands and Mickey Mouse was released on the 2-CD boxed set from 1993, Annette: A Musical Reunion with America's Girl Next Door

Some of the other songs in the serial, include "Reading, Writing, and Rhythm", "Meeting at the Malt Shop", "Don't Jump to Conclusions", and "How Will I Know My Love". The latter song was released as a single, which resulted in Walt Disney signing her to a recording contract on Disneyland Records

Merchandising

The TV show was also adapted into a comic book by Dan Spiegle, distributed by Dell Comics.

References

External links 
 

Television series by Disney
Disney Channel original programming
1958 American television series debuts
1958 American television series endings
The Mickey Mouse Club serials
American Broadcasting Company original programming
First-run syndicated television programs in the United States
Television shows adapted into comics
Television series about orphans
Television series based on books